Hamernia  is a village in the administrative district of Gmina Józefów, within Biłgoraj County, Lublin Voivodeship, in eastern Poland.

During the Polish census of 2011, the village was measured to have 343 inhabitants and was the fourth largest town in Gmina Józefów.

References

Villages in Biłgoraj County